The Greene Murder Case is a 1929 talking film produced and released by Paramount Pictures and based on the novel The Greene Murder Case, by S.S. Van Dine (Willard Huntington Wright). The novel had been published a year before this film was made. It stars William Powell in his second Philo Vance outing. Florence Eldridge and Jean Arthur costar.

In 1937, the film was remade as Night of Mystery.

Plot

Cast
William Powell - Philo Vance
Florence Eldridge - Sibella Greene
Ullrich Haupt, Sr. - Dr. Arthur Von Blon
Jean Arthur - Ada Greene
Eugene Pallette - Sgt. Ernest Heath
E. H. Calvert - District Attorney John F. x. Markham
Gertrude Norman - Mrs. Tobias Greene
Lowell Drew - Chester Greene
Morgan Farley - Rex Greene
Brandon Hurst - Sproot
Augusta Burmeister - Mrs. Gertrude Mannheim
Marcia Harris - Hemming

References

External links
The Greene Murder Case at IMDb.com

1929 films
Films based on American novels
Films directed by Frank Tuttle
1929 mystery films
Films produced by B. P. Schulberg
American mystery films
American black-and-white films
1920s English-language films
1920s American films
Philo Vance films